Vezzini may refer to:

Carlo Angelo Vezzini, Italian politician, mayor of Sesto ed Uniti

See also
Vizzini (disambiguation)
Vezzano (disambiguation)